Drammensfjord is a fjord in Norway that connects to Ytre Oslofjord on the west side.  It stretches to the north and northeast. The Drammenselva river discharges into the head of the fjord.  The municipality and city of Drammen which is named after the fjord is also found there. 

The majority of the fjord is within the county of Buskerud, but in the west and southwest it lies in Vestfold county. The land on the east side of the fjord is called Hurumhalvøya or the Hurum peninsula; it separates the Drammensfjord from the Oslofjord.

The fjord narrows to a strait at Svelvik in Vestfold on the west side and Verket in Hurum on the east side. The strait is crossed by an automobile ferry. This narrowing, some 200 meters broad and 10 meters deep, combined with the large freshwater inflow from the Drammenselva (one of Norway's largest rivers) and from Lierelva (river), results in the water north of the strait being brackish water. On the surface the water is fairly fresh, resulting in bathing areas that are free of jelly fish, while deeper the water has a higher salt concentration, with saltwater fish such as cod, pollock, flounder, and mackerel. The tide sets up one of Norway's strongest currents through the strait (outflow can reach speeds of 5 knots and the strait is known Selvikstrømmen (the Svelvik current) in Norwegian. Large ships can only sail in daylight and the largest only when assisted by tugboats. The strait has been made wider and deeper to accommodate traffic. Dead coral reefs are also found at 10–20 meters deep in the fjord. The maximum depth of the fjord northwards of the strait is 117 meters.

For a number of decades the Drammensfjord was polluted. The sewage and industrial discharges by industries in Drammen have been corrected so that the water is now much cleaner. Salmon and sea trout are again found in both the fjord and the Drammenselva.

In old Norse times the Drammensfjord was known by the name Dramn or Drofn, meaning hazy waters. In the Norse sagas Snorre Sturlason tells that Saint Olav hid himself from Canute the Great at a fjord which was called Dramn. At that time the water stood 4-5 meters higher and the fjord reached up to Hokksund. During the Viking Age, Drammensfjorden north of the Svelvik Strait was regarded as a lake and the Svelvik Strait was regarded as the mouth of the Drammen River.

References and notes

Fjords of Viken
Fjords of Vestfold og Telemark
Drammen
Røyken